The Metro Tower, also known as the NTS Tower, is an office high-rise building located in Lubbock, Texas. The 20-story building was originally known as the Great Plains Life Building after an insurance company that served as its first occupant. It suffered heavy damage in the 1970 Lubbock tornado, and sat vacant and derelict for several years amid talk of possible demolition. After extensive renovation, the building was reopened in 1975 and has been occupied ever since. It is the second tallest known building to have survived a direct hit by an F5 tornado. The tallest is the ALICO building in Waco, TX which is two stories taller. However, after the tornado, the Lubbock fire department closed some floors due to the worsening condition of the building.

In mid 2019, it was stated that MRE Capital would renovate the building. The renovation will include facelift and full restoration of the building. It would also add 89 residential units. The company would provide US$20 million budget for the revitalization. The building renovation is expected to start in late 2019, and be finished by the end of 2021.

The building was listed on the National Register of Historic Places in 2021.

References

External links
 Metro Tower Emporis Page
 

Office buildings in Lubbock, Texas
Skyscrapers in Lubbock, Texas
Office buildings completed in 1955
Skyscraper office buildings in Texas
1955 establishments in Texas
National Register of Historic Places in Lubbock County, Texas